Mohammed Haroon (also Ahaji Mohammed Haroon) is a Ghanaian politician and a teacher. He served as a member of the first parliament of the fourth republic of Ghana for Chogu-Tishigu constituency in the Northern Region of Ghana.

Early life and education 
Mohammed Haroon was born on 12 September 1959. He attended the University of Cape Coast.

Politics 
Mohammed Haroon was elected during the 1992 Ghanaian parliamentary election on the ticket of the National Democratic Congress.

He lost the seat in 1996 Ghanaian general election to Ibrahim Adam of the National Democratic Congress who won the seat with 22,368 votes which represented 31.30% of the share by defeating Mohammed A. Sadique of Convention People's Party who obtained 20,801 of the votes cast which represented 29.10% of the share; Abubakr Al-Hassan of the National Convention Party who obtained 5,020 votes which represented 7.00%; Faiz Aouni Moutrage an Independent who obtained 1,744 votes which represented 2.40%; Iddrisu Hudu of People's National Convention who obtained 1,738 votes which represented 2.40%; Al-Hassan Wayo Seini of the New Patriotic Party who obtained 1,394 votes which represented 2.00% and Abdul-Samed Muhtar of  National Convention Party who obtained 461 votes which represented 0.60%.

Career 
Mohammed Haroon was a former member of the first parliament of the fourth republic of Ghana for Chogu-Tishigu constituency from 7 January 1993 to 7 January 1997, He is a teacher.

Personal life 
He is a Muslim.

References 

1959 births
People from Northern Region (Ghana)
Ghanaian MPs 1993–1997
Ghanaian educators
University of Cape Coast alumni
National Democratic Congress (Ghana) politicians
Living people
Ghanaian Muslims